Anita Bathe is a Canadian television journalist, currently the anchor of CBC News Vancouver at Six on CBUT-DT in Vancouver, British Columbia.

A native of Abbotsford, British Columbia, she is a graduate of MEI and the British Columbia Institute of Technology. She began her career as a community channel reporter for Shaw TV in the Vancouver area, later working for various commercial radio stations in the Vancouver and Victoria markets before joining the CBC as a reporter in 2016. She became coanchor with Mike Killeen of the 6 p.m. news in 2018, and continued as sole anchor of the program after Killeen retired in 2021.

In 2022, she won the Canadian Screen Award for Best Local News Anchor at the 10th Canadian Screen Awards.

She is of South Asian background.

Awards
2022 - Canadian Screen Awards - Best local news anchor

References

Canadian television news anchors
Canadian women television journalists
Canadian Screen Award winning journalists
People from Abbotsford, British Columbia
British Columbia Institute of Technology alumni
Living people
Year of birth missing (living people)